The Serbia men's national volleyball team is the national team of Serbia. CEV considers Serbia the inheritor of the records of SFR Yugoslavia (1948–1991) and Serbia and Montenegro (1992–2006). Serbia won gold at the Summer Olympics in Sydney, Australia and bronze at the 1996 Summer Olympics in Atlanta.

The Yugoslav Olympic Committee declared the national volleyball team to be the best male team of the year in 2000, and the Olympic Committee of Serbia did the same in 2010 and 2013.

History
Serbia's most proud moment came at the Sydney Olympics in 2000 when under the name Yugoslavia it won Olympic gold. A heavy favourite was team Italy, who won the last three World Championships and the European title in 1995 and 1999, but they had yet to win an Olympic gold medal. They swept through Group B undefeated and won their quarter-final match over Australia. In the semifinals, Serbia & Montenegro (Yugoslavia), runners-up at the 1998 Worlds, and bronze medalists at the 1999 Europeans, triumphed in straight sets, again denying Italy an Olympic gold medal. Serbia & Montenegro had struggled in the pools, finishing only third behind Italy and Russia, but they defeated Russia in straight sets in the final to win the gold medal. As in 1996, all medalists came from the same pool, this time Group B.

Volleyball was brought to Serbia by g. William Viland, a professor of folklore and folk sports from Oakland, California, when the Red Cross held a series of lectures and demonstrations of American sports in Belgrade and Novi Sad. It is believed that his arrival marked the beginning of volleyball in this area, and in 1924 is considered the year when the first volleyball ball came to Serbia. During the period of occupation, between 1941 and 1944, volleyball was played very actively, numerous competitions were held, and more sports clubs/society's had established its volleyball section. The Serbian/Yugoslav Volleyball Federation was founded in 1946 by the Alliance for Physical Education of Yugoslavia. A year later, in 1947, the World Volleyball Federation (FIVB) was founded and the former Yugoslavia was one of the 14 founders. From 13 February 1949, the Volleyball Federation became an independent sports organization. Two years later, at the European Championships held in Paris, the women's volleyball team of Yugoslavia won the bronze medal for the first time. This success was repeated with the men's event in 1975, when Serbia for the first time in history hosted the biggest European competition, both the men's and women's events. The Serbian team in the last match of the final group defeated Bulgaria in the crowded hall of "Pioneer" in Belgrade and won the bronze medal.

2011 – 2019

In 2011 Serbia became European champion and in 2016 the champion of FIVB World League for the first time, with Marko Ivovic being crowned MVP of the tournament and Srecko Lisinac being chosen as the Best Middle Blocker.

2019 – 2021

After two bronze medal 2013 and 2017, Serbia become European champion again in 2019 with Uroš Kovačević being crowned MVP of the tournament.

2022 –

Medals

Results

Olympic Games

 Champions   Runners up   Third place   Fourth place

World Championship

 Champions   Runners up   Third place   Fourth place

World Cup

Squads
  2003 Japan –  Bronze medal
 Marić, Janić, Boškan, Mijić, N. Grbić, V. Grbić, Bjelica, Gerić, Vujević, Miljković, Ilić, Vusurović. Head coach: Travica

World Grand Champions Cup

 Champions   Runners up   Third place   Fourth place

  2001 –  Bronze medal
 Jokanović, Majdak, Škorić, Boškan, Mijić, N. Grbić, V. Grbić, Gerić, Vujević, Miljković, Vusurović. Head coach: Gajić

World League

 Champions   Runners up   Third place   Fourth place

Squads

  2015 Rio de Janeiro –  Silver medal
 Kovačević N., Kovačević U., Ivović, Petrić, Kostić, Stanković, Jovović, Atanasijević, Starović, Majstorović, Podraščanin, Rosić, Lisinac, Okolić. Head coach: Grbić
  2016 Kraków –  Gold medal
 Okolić, Kovačević, Katić, Stanković, Ivović, Jovović, Nikić, Dokić, Luburić, Brđović, Majstorović, Podraščanin, Rosić, Lisinac. Head coach: Grbić

Nations League

 Champions   Runners up   Third place   Fourth place

European Championship

 Champions   Runners up   Third place   Fourth place

Squads

  1995 –  Bronze medal
 Boškan, Brđović, Đurić, Gerić, N. Grbić, V. Grbić, Jokanović, Kovač, Mešter, Petrović, Tanasković, Vujević. Head Coach: Gajić
  1997 –  Silver medal
 Batez, Boškan, Đurić, Gerić, N. Grbić, V. Grbić, Jokanović, Kovač, Mešter, Tanasković, Vujević, Vušurović. Head Coach: Gajić
  1999 –  Bronze medal
 Batez, Boškan, Đurić, Gerić, N. Grbić, V. Grbić, Mešter, Mijić, Miljković, Petković, Tanasković, Vujević. Head Coach: Gajić
  2001 –  Gold medal
 Boškan, Gerić, N. Grbić, V. Grbić, Jokanović, Marić, Mešter, Mijić, Miljković, Škorić, Vujević, Vušurović. Head Coach: Gajić
   2005 –  Bronze medal
 Bjelica, Bojović, Boškan, Gerić, Ilić, Janić, Miljković, Mitrović, Samardžić, Stanković, Vujević. Head coach: Travica
  2007 –  Bronze medal
 Kovačević, Janić, Petković, Boškan, Stanković, Samardžić, Grbić, Nikić, Gerić, Miljković, Starović, Podraščanin. Head coach: Kolaković
   2011 –  Gold medal
N. Kovačević, U. Kovačević, Petković, Terzić, Stanković, Vujić, Nikić, Mitić, Rašić, Miljković, Starović, Atanasijević, Podraščanin, Rosić. Head Coach: Kolaković
   2013 –  Bronze medal
 Kovačević, Ivović, Petrić, Petković, Stanković, Vujić, Jovović, Nikić, Rašić, Atanasijević, Starović, Podraščanin, Rosić, Lisinac. Head coach: Kolaković
 2017 –  Bronze medal
 Okolić, Kovačević, Katić, Petrić, Škundrić, Stanković, Jovović, Buculjević, Atanasijević, Luburić, Majstorović, Podraščanin, Rosić, Lisinac. Head coach: Grbić
     2019 –  Gold medal
 Okolić, Kovačević, Petrić, Ćirović, Peković, Krsmanović, Ivović, Jovović, Atanasijević, Luburić, Majstorović, Podraščanin, Lisinac, Todorović. Head coach:  Kovač

European Games

 Champions   Runners up   Third place   Fourth place

Mediterranean Games

 Champions   Runners up   Third place   Fourth place

Results and fixtures

Previous matches

Forthcoming matches

Team

Current squad
The following is the Serbia roster in the 2022 FIVB Volleyball Men's World Championship.

Head coach:  Igor Kolaković

Coach history
  Zoran Gajić (1995–2002) 
  Veselin Vuković (2002–2003)
  Ljubomir Travica (2003–2006)
  Igor Kolaković (2006–2014)
  Nikola Grbić (2015–2019)
  Slobodan Kovač (2019–2021)
  Igor Kolaković (2022–present)

Notable players
 Ivan Miljković
 Nikola Grbić
 Andrija Gerić

 Slobodan Boškan
 Vladimir Grbić
 Slobodan Kovač
 Dejan Brđović
 Rajko Jokanović
 Goran Vujević
 Đula Mešter
 Vasa Mijić
 Žarko Petrović
 Igor Vušurović
 Bojan Janić
 Edin Škorić
 Veljko Petković
 Željko Tanasković

Kit providers
The table below shows the history of kit providers for the Serbia national volleyball team.

Sponsorship
Primary sponsors include: main sponsors like Poštanska štedionica. other sponsors: Škoda Auto, Radio Television of Serbia, Žurnal, Srbijagas, Posta, EPS and Blic.

See also
Serbia women's national volleyball team
Yugoslavia men's national volleyball team
Yugoslavia women's national volleyball team

References

External links

Official website
FIVB profile

National men's volleyball teams
Volleyball
Men's sport in Serbia
Volleyball in Serbia